Normandie Golf Club is a public golf course in St. Louis, Missouri and is one of the oldest public golf courses west of the Mississippi River.

The par-71 18-hole golf course was designed and built by Robert Foulis in 1901.

In April 2021, the Metropolitan Golf Foundation announced that Jack Nicklaus and his golf architecture firm Nicklaus Design had joined and would lead the philanthropic effort to renovate the golf course.

Scorecard

Source:

References

External links
Official website

Golf clubs and courses in Missouri
1901 establishments in Missouri
Buildings and structures in St. Louis County, Missouri